Valentine House may refer to:

in England
Valentine House, Essex, house of lineage, and/or estate home of the Raymond Baronetcy, of the Burrell baronets and in particular of Sir Charles Burrell, 3rd Baronet

in the United States
Campbell House (Okahumpka, Florida), also known as Valentine House, NRHP-listed
Valentine House (Macon, Georgia), NRHP-listed but demolished
John Valentine House, Muncie, Indiana, NRHP-listed in Delaware County
Valentine Soap Workers Cottages, Cambridge, Massachusetts, NRHP-listed
Valentine-French House, Fall River, Massachusetts, NRHP-listed
Walker and Valentine House, Rushford, Minnesota, NRHP-listed in Fillmore County, Minnesota
Valentine-Varian House, Bronx, New York City, NRHP-listed
Cock-Valentine House, Oyster Bay, New York, one of Oyster Bay's town landmarks
Valentine Hall, a building at St. Lawrence University
Obidian W. Valentine House, a contributing building in the Main Street Historic District (Roslyn, New York), NRHP-listed
Kent-Valentine House, Richmond, Virginia, NRHP-listed
Wickham House, also known as the Wickham-Valentine House or the Valentine Museum, in Richmond, Virginia, a U.S. National Historic Landmark 
Valentine Richmond History Center, Richmond, Virginia

See also
Valentine School (disambiguation)
Valentine Building (disambiguation)